Messi and Maud is a 2017 Dutch drama film directed by Marleen Jonkman. In July 2018, it was one of nine films shortlisted to be the Dutch entry for the Best Foreign Language Film at the 91st Academy Awards, but it was not selected.

Cast
 Cristóbal Farias as Messi
 Rifka Lodeizen as Maud

References

External links
 

2017 films
2017 drama films
Dutch drama films
2010s Dutch-language films
2010s Spanish-language films
2017 multilingual films
Dutch multilingual films
Lionel Messi